Monocalcium aluminate (CaAl2O4) is one of the series of calcium aluminates.  It does occur in nature, although only very rarely, as two polymorphs known as krotite and dmitryivanovite, both from meteorites. It is important in the composition of calcium aluminate cements.

Properties
Monocalcium aluminate is formed when the appropriate proportions of calcium carbonate and aluminium oxide are heated together until the mixture melts.  It melts incongruently at 1390 °C.  The crystal is monoclinic and pseudohexagonal, and has density 2945 kg.m−3.  In calcium aluminate cements, it exists as a solid solution in which the amount of minor elements depends upon the bulk composition of the cement.  A typical composition is Ca0.93Al1.94Fe0.11Si0.02O4.  It reacts rapidly with water, forming the metastable hydrate CaO·Al2O3·10H2O, or a mixture of 2CaO·Al2O3·8H2O, 3CaO·Al2O3·6H2O and Al(OH)3 gel.  These reactions form the first stage of strength development in calcium aluminate cements.

References

Cement
Calcium compounds
Aluminates